The 2019 Shanghai International Film Festival was the 22nd such festival devoted to international cinema held in Shanghai, China.

International Jury 
The members of the jury for the Golden Goblet Award were:

 President: Nuri Bilge Ceylan (Turkish director)
 Paolo Genovese (Italian director)
 Zhao Tao (Chinese actress)
 Aleksey German Jr. (Russian director)
 Nicolas Celis (Mexican producer )
 Wang Jingchun (Chinese actor)

Documentary Film Jury:

 President: Viktor Kossakovsky (Russian director)
 Zhou Hao (Chinese director of The Chinese Mayor) 
 Isabelle Arrate Fernandez (Danish producer of 5 Broken Camera)

Animation Jury:

 President: Tomm Moore (Irish director)

Short Film Jury:

 President: Raul Garcia (American director of Extraordinary Tales)

In Competition

Drama

Documentary

Animation

Short Film

Live Action

Animated

Award Winners

Golden Goblet Awards 

 Best Feature Film: Castle of Dreams (Iran)
 Jury Grand Prix: Inhale-Exhale, Georgia/Russia/Sweden
 Best Director: Reza Mirakarimi for Castle of Dreams
 Best Actor: (tie) Chang Feng for The Return and Hamed Behdad for Castle of Dreams
 Best Actress: Salome Demuria for Inhale-Exhale
 Best Screenplay: Aleksander Lungin & Pavel Lungin for Brotherhood (Russia)
 Best Cinematography: Jake Pollock for Spring Tide
 Outstanding Artistic Achievement: Trees Under the Sun (India)
 Best Documentary: Bridge of Time
 Best Animated Movie: Ride Your Wave (Japan)
 Best Animated Short: La Noria (Spain) 
 Best Live Action Short: Nowhere To Put(China)

Asian New Talent Awards 

 Best Film: To Live To Sing
 Best Director: Yuko Hakota for Blue Hour
 Best Script Writer: Yusuf Radjamuda for Mountain Song
 Best Cinematographer: 
 Best Actor: 
 Best Actress:

Jackie Chan Action Movie Awards 
Moved away from SIFF to become its own event on July 21, 2019.

Notable Attendees 
Notable attendees of the festival include William Feng, Ng See-yuen, TIFF director Takeo Hisamatsu and CFF director Thierry Fremaux and Amanda Seyfried.

References

External links 
 Official Site

Shanghai International Film Festival
2019 film festivals
2019 festivals in Asia
21st century in Shanghai